Juan Lladó (1918–1956) was a Spanish screenwriter and film director.

Selected filmography
 The Drummer of Bruch (1948)
 In a Corner of Spain (1949)
 The Vila Family (1950)
 Criminal Brigade (1950)
 Persecution in Madrid (1952)
 The Dance of the Heart (1953)
 One Bullet Is Enough (1954)
 The Louts (1954)

References

Bibliography 
 Bentley, Bernard. A Companion to Spanish Cinema. Boydell & Brewer 2008.

External links 
 

1918 births
1956 deaths
Spanish film directors
Spanish male screenwriters
People from Barcelona
20th-century Spanish screenwriters
20th-century Spanish male writers